Franz von Holstein (16 February 1826 – 22 May 1878) was a German composer.

Life 
Born in Braunschweig, Holstein was the son of the Duchy of Brunswick colonel and Council of wars Werner von Holstein (1784–1857).

As Oberleutnant, his assignment as adjutant of the 2nd Landwehr Battalion followed from 18 March 1850, until Holstein finally took his leave on 11 March 1853.

Already during his officer training, he composed the opera Zwei Nächte in Venedig as well as Lieder and ballads. In 1853, he came to Leipzig, where he studied counterpoint with Moritz Hauptmann and had piano lessons with Ignaz Moscheles. After stays in Rome, Berlin and Paris, he took over the direction of the Bach Society in Leipzig. In addition to three operas, he wrote two overtures, a cantata, chamber music works and piano pieces and had an outstanding reputation as a Lieder composer.

Holstein died in Leipzig at the age of 52 and was buried in the Friedenspark (now Lapidarium Alter Johannisfriedhof). In this city, his wife Hedwig, daughter of the city councillor Rudolf Julius Salomon, established the so-called Holstein-Stift, a foundation to support impecunious music students.

Work 
 Operas:
 Der Haideschacht. (1868)
 Der Erbe von Morley. (1872)
 Die Hochländer. (1876)
 Lieder for one voice, duets, mixed and men's chorus.
 Chamber music
 Ouvertüres

Further reading 
 Peter Ackermann: Zwischen Musikdrama und Spieloper. Franz von Holsteins musikalische Bühnenwerke. In Deutsche Oper zwischen Wagner und Strauss. S. Döhring (ed.), Chemnitz 1998. .
 
 Gerhart Glaser: Franz von Holstein. Ein Dichterkomponist des 19. Jahrhunderts. Leipzig 1930. (Dissertation)
 von Kortzfleisch: Geschichte des Herzoglich Braunschweigischen Infanterie-Regiments und seiner Stammtruppen 1809–1867. Druck und Verlag von Albert Limbach. Braunschweig 1896. .
 Michael Märker, Willi Kahl: Holstein, Franz von. In Ludwig Finscher (ed.): Die Musik in Geschichte und Gegenwart. Second edition, Personenteil, volume 8 (Gribenski – Hilverding). Bärenreiter/Metzler, Kassel among others 2002,  (Online-Edition, Subscription required for full access)

References

External links 

 
 
 
 
 List of works on Operone.
 Holstein, Franz von on BMLO

German Romantic composers
German opera composers
Male opera composers
1826 births
1878 deaths
Musicians from Braunschweig